Liptena is a genus of butterflies in the family Lycaenidae. Liptena is endemic to the Afrotropics.

Species

References

Seitz, A. Die Gross-Schmetterlinge der Erde 13: Die Afrikanischen Tagfalter. Plate XIII 64

 
Poritiinae
Taxa named by John O. Westwood
Lycaenidae genera